Mount Nebo is the southernmost and highest mountain in the Wasatch Range of Utah, in the United States, and the centerpiece of the Mount Nebo Wilderness, inside the Uinta National Forest. It is named after the biblical Mount Nebo, overlooking Israel from the east of the Jordan river, which is said to be the place of Moses' death.

Mount Nebo has two summits: the northern summit reaches , and the southern summit reaches . Early surveys placed the southern peak as the highest, but the mountain was resurveyed in the 1970s and the northern peak was found to be higher. It is the high point of Utah County.

The mountain is typically partially or completely covered in snow from mid-October until July. Nearby towns include Payson, Nephi, and Provo.

A substantial trail leads to the south summit, accessible from starting points on the east or west of the mountain. Another trail accesses the north summit, starting northeast of the mountain. A "bench trail" runs along the mountain's east side from north to south at roughly 9,000 feet elevation. Although strenuous, all of these trails are popular with hikers; many are dangerous places for horseback riders. One old-time local rider warns: "There's dead horses in every canyon on that mountain!"

The Mount Nebo Scenic Byway is a federally designated National Scenic Byway which departs I-15 at Payson and travels south through the Mount Nebo Wilderness, climbing to over 9,000 feet before rejoining the interstate at Nephi. The route features panoramic views of Mount Nebo, the Utah Valley, and Utah Lake far below. There are numerous trailheads along the route for the hiking enthusiast, including a short walk to the "Devil's Kitchen", an area that has been described as a "mini Bryce Canyon".

See also
 List of Ultras of the United States

References

External links

 Mt. Nebo. SummitPost.
 Mount Nebo, Utah. Peakbagger.

Mountains of Juab County, Utah
Mountains of Utah
Mountains of Utah County, Utah
Uinta National Forest
Wasatch Range